The Belgrade–Šid railway officially designated the Railway line 1 is a  long railway line in Serbia that connects the city of Belgrade with the Croatian railway network and the city of Zagreb. Its route follows the Sava river valley. It is an integral part of the Pan-European Corridor X, running from Salzburg and Ljubljana towards Skopje and Thessaloniki. It is electrified and mostly double-tracked.

History
It was the route of the Orient Express service from 1919 to 1977.

As part of the Zagreb–Belgrade railway, electrification was finished in 1970.

Gallery

See also
Pan-European Corridor X

References

External links

Railway lines in Serbia
International railway lines
Croatia–Serbia border